The House Subcommittee on Forestry is a subcommittee within the House Agriculture Committee. Until the 118th Congress, it had jurisdiction over resource conservation and was known as the Subcommittee on Conservation and Forestry.

It is currently chaired by Republican Doug LaMalfa of California.

Jurisdiction
Policies and statutes relating to forestry and all forests under the jurisdiction of the Committee on Agriculture; regulatory issues impacting national forests; and related oversight of such issues.

Members, 118th Congress

Historical membership rosters

117th Congress

116th Congress

115th Congress

References

External links
Subcommittee page

Agriculture Conservation and Forestry